Platyptilia isoterma is a moth of the family Pterophoridae. It is found in New Zealand.

The wingspan is about 18 mm. The head is white mixed with dark reddish-fuscous. The antennae are grey with a blackish line above. The thorax is whitish irrorated (speckled) with dark reddish-fuscous and the abdomen is dark reddish-fuscous sprinkled with whitish, and mixed with blackish on the sides towards the middle. The forewings are reddish-fuscous irrorated with whitish and sprinkled with dark fuscous. The hindwings are grey, mixed with black scales on the dorsum.

References

Moths described in 1909
isoterma
Endemic fauna of New Zealand
Moths of New Zealand
Endemic moths of New Zealand